Huayo or Wayu (Quechua for fruit) is one of thirteen districts of the province Pataz in Peru.

References